Jounl is a village in Todabhim, Karauli district in the Indian State of Rajasthan

Jounl is located beside the NH11 near Kariri village and 5 km away from the RJ SH 22 which is passing through the Khohra Mulla village. There are total five villages under the Gram panchayat Jounl. They are Jounl, Daurawali, Kamalpuriya, Bishanpura and Khediya. The village's current population is near 1000.

Religious view 
Hindus are in majority in this village. There are several temples in this village, including:
Bhairo (Golar) Baba Temple which is situated on the mountain.
Hiraman Baba Temple
Pareet Baba Temple
Bade Baba Ashram which is situated on the mountain

Geographical view 
There is a mountain range beside this village .

An anicat (mini size dam) also known as ram talai is also there below that mountain range.

References

Villages in Karauli district